Global is a DVD and CD set of Paul van Dyk's worldwide DJing tours.  The CD is a music-only version of the DVD. DVD extras (not matched on the CD) include videos of Another Way, For An Angel, Forbidden Fruit, We Are Alive and Tell Me Why (The Riddle).

Track listing
We Are Alive – 3:19
Seven Ways – 5:12
Forbidden Fruit – 6:16
Beautiful Place – 6:02
Another Way – 6:20
Tell Me Why – 5:48
Featuring Saint Etienne
Step Right On – 5:22
Words – 5:49
Together We Will Conquer – 7:17
A Magical Moment – 4:38
For an Angel – 7:17
Animacion – 7:14
My World – 3:50

References

External links

2003 albums
Mute Records albums
Paul van Dyk albums
Positiva Records albums
Urban Records albums